Mokhovoye is a settlement in Zalegoshchensky District, Oryol Oblast, the administrative center of the Mokhovskoye Rural Settlement. It had a population of 904 according to the 2010 Census.

References 

Rural localities in Oryol Oblast